Podom are sculpted sarcophagi traditional to the Toba Batak of Sumatra. They have the forms of longhouse roofs or boats. They are made of stone which is also used for rice mortars (losung batu) and funeral urns (parholian), and statuary

See also
 Waruga, sarcophagi in northern Sumatra

References

Sarcophagi
Buildings and structures in Sumatra
Burial monuments and structures
Death in Indonesia
Indonesian art
Stone monuments and memorials